Pennsylvania's twentieth congressional district was a congressional district in southwestern Pennsylvania.  It was created following the 1830 Census and was disbanded after the 2000 Census removed two representatives from Pennsylvania.  The  is generally considered to be its successor, although the  contains some of its territory.

List of members representing the district

Recent electoral history

Source:

References

 Congressional Biographical Directory of the United States 1774–present

20
Former congressional districts of the United States
Constituencies established in 1833
1833 establishments in Pennsylvania
Constituencies disestablished in 2003
2003 disestablishments in Pennsylvania